Ussel is a commune in the Corrèze department in central France. Its inhabitants are called Ussellois.

Location
The community of Ussel is located in the Massif central on the foothills of the plateau de Millevaches.  The city itself sits on a hilltop in between the valley of the river Diège and the valley of the river Sarsonne. It is situated at an altitude of 2070 ft (631 m), in the Massif Central on the last buttress of the Plateau de Millevaches. Ussel is crossed by the Green Meridian.

Hydrography
Three main watercourses are flowing through the community, the river Diège (The town sometimes is called Ussel-sur-Diège), the river Sarsonne and the stream of Étang Roux.

Demography
In 2017, the population of Ussel was 9,736 inhabitants.

Historical heritage

Places and monuments
The Borde Castle, 15th century, reshuffled during the 17th century
The Mothe Castle, 16th century, historical monument since 1980
The Ventadour Hotel, historical monument since 1932
The Church Saint-Martin, 13th century, classified historical monument since 1926
The Roman Eagle situated in the Voltaire Square. This monument is sculpted in the granite, and discovered in The Peuch Mill, on the Sarsonne. It was cleaned and shifted en 2009 during the refurbishment of the Voltaire Square.
The Chapel of Notre-Dame de la Chabane
The Church Saint Martial
The Church Notre-Dame-de-l’Assomption, in La Tourette
The Church Saint-Dizier in Saint-Dézéry

Parks and green areas
Ussel is well known thanks to its many green and natural areas. It offers  the city a countrified atmosphere very appreciated by its inhabitants. Besides gardens, Ussel is composed of a large number of natural spaces, with hiking and walking trails. The municipality is a floral city which obtained three flowers during the contest "villes et villages fleuris".

Transportation
The highway A 89 provides an easy access to the towns. Two main exits feeds the city. Exit 23 (Mauriac-Maymac-Ussel Ouest) south-west of town and Exit 24 (Ussel Est-Eygurande) North East of town. 
The construction of the highway has highly improved the security but also the comfort inside the town. This highway is a component of the European route E70.

Ussel is also crossed by the RN 89. This road which was retrofitted to a regional road links Bordeaux to Lyon via Clermont-Ferrand.

The train station of Ussel lies on a main railtrack linking Lyon to Bordeaux. As of 2022, there are TER Nouvelle-Aquitaine services to Bordeaux, Brive-la-Gaillarde and Limoges.

The closest airports are Limoges-Bellegarde, Clermont-Ferrand-Auvergne.

The Ussel-Thalamy airfield is a leisure and tourist oriented place. It is located a few kilometers away from town.

Twinning
Ussel is paired with Auray (France), located in the department of Morbihan.

Economy

Forest products and wood

Ussel shelters many company in the wood field, like the panel producer MDF Isoroy, the stratified clothes designer Polyrey, the interior door manufacturer Jeld Wen, the front door manufacturer Bel .

Mining and steel
The Des farges mine, located 3 kilometers from Ussel, is part of Nouvelle-Aquitaine's mining. The extraction of lead was applied, as well as silver and much more, until its closure in 1981.
La Société des fonderies d'Ussel (SFU) is one of the metallurgical representative of the region.

Food processing
The city is the center of a farming region, marked by the bovine breed limousine and the pig farming at the same time. The pork butcher group Loste owns a production site of salted meat in the industrial area Empereur.
Regional products are beef and pork, hunting and fishing products, and harvest products (cep, chanterelle, blueberry ) Local dishes are the tourtou or the farcidure, for example.

Pharmaceutical industry
The industrial sector sets up in High-Corrèze since 1990 when Bristol-Myers Squibb settles a production site in the town of Meymac.
In 1999, Pierre Fabre came to Ussel by building a distribution and logistics center in the industrial zone of L'Empereur.
The company Chesapeake features a production unit specializing in packaging for the pharmaceutical industry (holsters and instructions), also located in the industrial zone of "The Emperor".

Culture

Museum of Ussel
The museum of Ussel is dedicated to history, arts and tradition of the region of Ussel. It features some objects and pictorial representations. Another part is devoted to the history of printing and exhibitions of engraving. Many of the objects exhibited concerning agricultural trades were kindly provided by Dr. Ernest Chiocconi, a salvage dealer. He had recovered objects in agricultural holdings which were no longer used.

Transcorrezien Railway Line

Ussel was the northern terminus of the Metre Gauge Transcorrezien railway line linking Tulle to Ussel via Marcillac-la-Croisille, Lapleau, Soursac and Liginiac. This line was part of the narrow gauge network of railways in the Corrèze region.

While the line has disappeared, many architectural and track elements still remain and can be visited by the public. Many of the stations are preserved and have been restored and a Tourist Route created which enables visitors to follow the track from its terminus at Languenne on the outskirts of Tulle to Ussel. The road signs are rectangular with "Transcorrezien" shown on them on a white background

The area includes the Roche Noir Viaduct, a suspension bridge crossing the deep gorge of the Luzège river between Lapleau and Soursac. It is possible to visit both ends of the bridge but, while it remains in good condition, it is closed even to pedestrians.

The Soursac end of the bridge leads straight into a 150 m-long curved tunnel. Visitors can park at the Soursac end, walk through the tunnel (which is lit) and emerge by the bridge.

See also
Communes of the Corrèze department

References

Communes of Corrèze
Subprefectures in France
Lemovices
Limousin
Corrèze communes articles needing translation from French Wikipedia